The 1998 New England 200 was the fifth round of the 1998 Indy Racing League. The race was held on June 28, 1998, at the  New Hampshire International Speedway in Loudon, New Hampshire. It would be the last Indy car race held at this track until the 2011 MoveThatBlock.com Indy 225.

Report

Qualifying

Two laps qualifying. The worst lap from any of the drivers were not published, and therefore are unknown.

  Crashed during his qualifying attempt, but was allowed to start the race at the back of the field using a provisional.

Failed to qualify or withdrew
 Roberto Guerrero for Pagan Racing - fired the week prior. The team decided to sit out the event (as well as the next event at Dover) in order to search and accommodate a replacement driver.
 Greg Ray for Knapp Motorsports - sat out the event because of a shortage of funds.

Race

A NASCAR Modified race preceding the IRL race left a very slippery type of marbles in the surface. After Jeff Ward had jumped polesitter Billy Boat on the start, Kenny Bräck spun in turn 3 on the first lap and collected John Paul Jr. Bräck was able to continue after repairs, but Paul was out. Immediately after that incident, Jack Hewitt lost the back end exiting turn 4 and backed into the front stretch wall. Scott Sharp jumped Ward on the restart until he chose to pit under caution (caused by J. J. Yeley's crash) on lap 27, handing the lead back to Ward.

This series of closely spaced yellows continued when Boat, who had been falling back, spun into the infield in turn 2. After the green on lap 32, Ward continued to lead until he was black flagged with fire coming out from under the car on lap 55. Scott Goodyear inherited the lead and looked very strong, pursued by Buddy Lazier and Davey Hamilton, who had set the fast lap of the race, but his chances were hurt when he was penalised for speeding in the pits during a caution on lap 77. Pit stops jumbled the running order and left Tony Stewart, Sharp, Arie Luyendyk and Eliseo Salazar pursuing Goodyear.

On lap 92, Stewart caught and passed Goodyear, just before a big crash in turn 2 on lap 95. Yeley, just returned to the track after extensive repairs, spun and contacted Donnie Beechler, who had been moving up through the field. Boat spun to avoid the wreck, but his car spun unexpectedly towards the inside, and he was hit by Raul Boesel. All four were out and Boat suffered a broken thigh, an injury that would force him to miss some races and end his championship hopes.

There were no further cautions in the second half of the race, which was dominated by Stewart. His biggest threats suffered misfortune: Sharp's engine stalled during a pit stop on lap 147, while Goodyear suffered a gearbox failure and was forced to run in fourth gear. Despite concern about the engine blowing (it could be heard hitting the rev limiter quite notably on the onboards), it held through the end of the race, and even the Canadian was able to reel in Stewart in traffic, but could not follow him in clear runs. Stewart led the final 36 laps to win over Goodyear, Sharp, Hamilton, and Luyendyk. Salazar's sixth-place finish was the best to date for the Riley & Scott chassis. Poor attendance at the event for the fifth year in a row led to the contract not being renewed for 1999.

Race Statistics
Lead changes: 9 among 6 drivers

Standings after the race

Drivers' Championship standings

 Note: Only the top five positions are included for the standings.

References

External links
IndyCar official website

1998 in IndyCar
1998 in sports in New Hampshire
Motorsport in New Hampshire